Selsdon is an area in South-East London, England, located in the London Borough of Croydon, in the ceremonial county of Greater London. Prior to 1965 it was in the historic county of Surrey. It is located south of Coombe and Addiscombe, west of Forestdale, north of Hamsey Green and Farleigh, and east of Sanderstead.

History

Selsdon was traditional a rural area, with most of the whole area being part of Selsdon Park Estate, once well known as hunting and shooting grounds in the area. In 1923 the estate was broken up and divided into smallholdings, with the aim of giving them to war veterans. These largely proved too small, however further building occurred and the area became a prosperous suburb, remarkable for its many Art Deco houses.

After concerns were raised about the rapid development of the village a committee was formed to ensure that an area of  would be set aside and saved for a nature reserve and bird sanctuary. This opened to the public in 1936 and was given to the National Trust after Coulsdon and Purley Urban District Council and the Corporation of Croydon agreed to manage it jointly. Selsdon Wood now consists of five large meadows surrounded by extensive woodland and ancient hedges and it retains the character of a historical woodland. In the second meadow of the Selsdon Wood area there is a bomb crater, and another in Selsdon recreation ground just inside the woods which are closed off. Much wildlife may be found in the wooded areas of Selsdon such as deer, and more recently parakeets.

The old Estate mansion had been converted into the Selsdon Park Hotel in 1925. In 1970 it was the venue of a Conservative Shadow Cabinet meeting to settle the party's manifesto for the impending general election. Labour Party leader Harold Wilson coined the phrase Selsdon Man to describe the free market approach which was agreed, and the Selsdon Group was later formed within the Conservative Party to campaign for its retention.

Geography 
The main shopping area of Selsdon is concentrated on Addington Road east of the junction with Farley Road/Old Farleigh Road. It contains a variety of shops, banks, cafes, the local Baptist Church and two pubs (the Sir Julian Huxley and a micro-pub).

In January 2007 the prominent Selsdon Clock, in rustic style with a brushwood motif round its face by Jon Mills, was installed on the Selsdon Triangle, on the plinth of a former public lavatory, in front of the library and Sainsbury's supermarket.

Selsdon Hall is based underneath Sainsbury's supermarket and the library. It is designed to be a hub for the local community. It comprises a hall that can be hired privately and a coffee shop, which is open to all members of the public.

The area is currently undergoing a gentle renovation with the well known disused garage being converted into retail and residential units.

Transport

Rail and tram
Selsdon was formerly served by Selsdon railway station although the station was actually located 2 miles from the town centre and was closed in 1983.

London Tram stops at Gravel Hill and Coombe Lane are located 1.5 and 2 miles from the town centre respectively.

Buses
Selsdon is served by London Buses routes 64, 359, 412 and 433 which provide connections to Croydon Town Centre, New Addington, Purley and Thornton Heath.

It is also served by Southdown PSV routes 409 & 411 which provide connections to Caterham, Redhill and East Grinstead.

Demography
In the 2011 census, Selsdon and Ballards was White or White British (80.1%), Asian or Asian British (10.4%), Black or Black British (5.2%), Mixed/multiple ethnic groups (2.6%), and  Other ethnic group (1%). The largest single ethnicity is White British (75.1%).

Gallery

See also
John Ruskin College

References

Districts of the London Borough of Croydon
Areas of London
District centres of London